Monilink Limited (stylized MONILINK) was the banking service operating in the United Kingdom that gave customers access to their financial information directly from their mobile phones. Created in 2003 Monilink was a joint venture between Monitise and LINK. Promotional material promised consumers that, through the service: “The future of banking is in your hands”.

Latterly, Monilink offered customers the chance to check their bank balance in real-time, view a mini statement detailing the last six transactions and add credit to up to five pay as you go phones. Future services would include options to move money between accounts, pay bills, and purchase travel tickets.

The company became dormant around 2011 and was wound up in 2015.

Banking partners 
By June 2008, HSBC, First Direct, Alliance & Leicester, NatWest, Royal Bank of Scotland, Ulster Bank and Lloyds TSB. Alliance & Leicester withdrew, after being taken over by Santander.

Network partners 
All the mobile phone companies in the UK enable Monilink: Vodafone, O2, Orange, T-Mobile and 3. Tesco Mobile and Virgin Mobile are also participating.

Awards 
MONILINK was recognised by the World Economic Forum in 2006 as a technology pioneer in the area of mobile banking.

External links 
 www.monilink.co.uk

UK mobile phone companies 

 T-Mobile UK
 Vodafone UK
 O2
 Orange UK

Mobile virtual network operators 

 BT Mobile
 Dot Mobile
 Fresh Mobile
 TalkTalk Group
 Tesco Mobile
 Virgin Mobile

Banking in the United Kingdom
Mobile content